South is a constituency of the European Parliament in Ireland. It elects 5 Members of the European Parliament (MEPs) using proportional representation by means of the single transferable vote (PR-STV).

History and boundaries
It was created in 2004 with the same area as the old Munster constituency, except for County Clare which was then in North-West. It is sometimes referred to as Ireland South. The area of constituency has increased twice.

For the 2019 European Parliament election, a reapportionment following Brexit and the loss of 73 MEPs from the United Kingdom gave two additional seats to Ireland. Following a recommendation of the Constituency Commission, South gained territory and an additional seat, from 4 to 5. However, Deirdre Clune, as the last candidate elected, did not take her seat until after the United Kingdom left the European Union.

In 2016, 74.1% of the constituency's population lived in Munster, while the southern Leinster counties accounted for 25.9%.

It comprises the counties of Carlow, Clare, Cork, Kerry, Kilkenny, Laois, Limerick, Offaly, Tipperary, Waterford, Wexford and Wicklow; the cities of Cork, Limerick and Waterford.

The main urban areas (by population size) are Cork, Limerick, Waterford, Bray, Kilkenny, Ennis, Carlow, Tralee, Tullamore, Portlaoise and Wexford.

MEPs

Elections

2019 election

Following a recheck of the votes for O'Sullivan and Ní Riada after the 18th count, a full recount was requested by the Sinn Féin candidate. Returning officer Martin Harvey announced that the recount would begin on 4 June. RTÉ reported that the recount could take up to 28 working days. On 4 June, Ní Riada withdrew the request for a recount. After the transfer of Ní Riada's votes and Mick Wallace's surplus, Grace O'Sullivan and Deirdre Clune were deemed elected, but Clune did not take office as an MEP until Brexit had taken effect.

2014 election

2009 election

2004 election

See also
European Parliament constituencies in the Republic of Ireland

Footnotes

References

External links
South MEPs – European Parliament Office in Ireland

European Parliament constituencies in the Republic of Ireland
2004 establishments in Ireland
Constituencies established in 2004